Hasnain Masoodi is an Indian politician from the Jammu & Kashmir National Conference Party and currently a Member of Parliament in the 17th Lok Sabha representing Anantnag Lok Sabha seat. He is a former judge of the High Court of Jammu and Kashmir.He was study in Harvard University ( LLM )

Judge career 

He was appointed Principal District Judge from 2007 to 2009 and was Jammu & Kashmir High Court Judge from 2009 to 2016. He was also Chairperson of the Jammu & Kashmir State Juvenile Justice Panel.

As a High Court judge, Masoodi ruled in October 2015 that the Article 370 of the Constitution of India that gives special status to the state of Jammu and Kashmir is permanent.

Political career 

In 2019, he was elected to Lok Sabha, the lower house of the Indian Parliament, from the Anantnag constituency, after defeating former chief minister Mehbooba Mufti in the election by nearly 10,000 votes. He became the member of  Standing Committee on Urban Development, Library Committee, and Consultative Committee, Ministry of Culture and Tourism.

In August 2019, as the Union government moved to revoke of the provisions of Article 370, Masoodi opposed the resolution in the Lok Sabha. After the resolutions were passed by both the Houses of Parliament, Masoodi petitioned the Supreme Court of India, along with Mohammad Akbar Lone, asking for the revocation to be declared invalid.

On 20 October he was appointed coordinator of People's Alliance for Gupkar Declaration

References

Jammu & Kashmir National Conference politicians
Living people
Members of the Jammu and Kashmir Legislative Council
India MPs 2019–present
Harvard Law School alumni
People from Pulwama
1954 births